Count Georgi Arsenyevich Emmanuel (Russian: Георгий Арсеньевич Эммануэль) (13 April 1775–26 January 1837) was a Russian general of Serbian origin who participated in the Napoleonic Wars.

He was promoted to major general on 26 December 1812 and after the end of the battle of Paris to general on 27 March 1814. After returning to Russia, he was put in command of the 4th Dragoon Division. On 25 June 1825 he became the supreme commander and governor of the Caucasus. He was promoted to general of the cavalry in July 1828, during the Russo-Turkish War (1828-29). In 1829 he organised and led the first Russian scientific expedition to Mount Elbrus, for which he was made a member of the Russian Academy of Sciences.

See also
 Peter Ivanovich Ivelich
 Andrei Miloradovich
 Avram Ratkov
 Jovan Horvat
 Nikolay Depreradovich

References

External links
http://www.museum.ru/museum/1812/Persons/Slovar/sl_ye03.html

1775 births
1837 deaths
Russian commanders of the Napoleonic Wars
People from the Russian Empire of Serbian descent
Habsburg Serbs
19th-century Serbian people
19th-century people from the Russian Empire
People from Vršac
Habsburg monarchy emigrants to the Russian Empire
People of the Caucasian War
Russian military personnel of the Caucasian War